The 2004 Major League Baseball season ended when the Boston Red Sox defeated the St. Louis Cardinals in a four-game World Series sweep. The Red Sox championship ended an 86-year-long drought known as the Curse of the Bambino. The Red Sox were also the first team in MLB history and the third team from a major North American professional sports league ever to come back from a 3–0 postseason series deficit and win. This happened in the ALCS against the New York Yankees.

The Montreal Expos would play their last season in Montreal, before relocating to Washington DC, becoming the Washington Nationals in 2005.

Statistical leaders

Standings

American League

National League

Postseason

2004 was the last postseason until 2020 where both LCS went to 7 games.

Bracket

Note: Two teams in the same division could not meet in the division series.

Managers

American League

National League

±hosted the MLB All Star Game

Milestones

The following players reached major milestones in 2004:

Perfect game

Randy Johnson pitched the 17th perfect game in MLB history on May 18, 2004.

4000 strikeouts

Randy Johnson struck out Jeff Cirillo on June 29, 2004 for his 4000th strikeout.

500 Home Run Club

Ken Griffey Jr. – June 20

300 Wins Club

Greg Maddux – August 7, 2004

Single-Season Hits Record Broken

Ichiro Suzuki – 262 Hits (broke George Sisler's 84-year-old record of 257)

Walk-off home runs

There were a total of 80 walk-off home runs, which was then the MLB single-season record until 2018.

Awards

Other awards
Edgar Martínez Award (Best designated hitter): David Ortiz (BOS)
Hank Aaron Award: Manny Ramirez (BOS, American); Barry Bonds (SF, National).
Roberto Clemente Award (Humanitarian): Edgar Martínez (SEA).
Rolaids Relief Man Award: Mariano Rivera (NYY, American); Éric Gagné (LA, National).
Warren Spahn Award (Best left-handed pitcher): Johan Santana (MIN)

Player of the Month

Pitcher of the Month

Rookie of the Month

Home Field Attendance & Payroll

See also
2004 Nippon Professional Baseball season

References

External links
 2004 Major League Baseball season schedule at Baseball Reference

 
Major League Baseball seasons